Sir John Robertson Dunn Crichton (2 November 1912 – 12 July 1985) was a British barrister and High Court judge.

Biography 
The son of Alexander Cansh Crichton and Beatrice Crichton, of Wallasey, Cheshire, Crichton was educated at Sedbergh School and Balliol College, Oxford. He was called to the Bar by the Middle Temple in 1936. During the Second World War, he served with the Royal Artillery (Territorial Army). Returning to the Bar after the war, he was made a King's Counsel in 1951.

Crichton was Recorder of Blackpool from 1952 to 1960, Judge of Appeal of the Isle of Man from 1956 to 1960, and Recorder of Manchester and Judge of the Crown Court at Manchester from 1960 to 1967, when he was appointed a Justice of the High Court. Receiving the customary knighthood, he was assigned to the Queen's Bench Division, retiring in 1977.

He married Margaret Vanderlip Watrous, daughter of Colonel Livingston Watrous, of Washington, DC, and Nantucket, Massachusetts; they had two sons and one daughter.

References 
 

British barristers
Queen's Bench Division judges
1912 births
1985 deaths
English King's Counsel
20th-century King's Counsel
Royal Artillery personnel
British Army personnel of World War II
Members of the Middle Temple
People educated at Sedbergh School
Alumni of Balliol College, Oxford